Censorship of images was widespread in the Soviet Union. Visual censorship was exploited in a political context, particularly during the political purges of Joseph Stalin, where the Soviet government attempted to erase some of the purged figures from Soviet history, and took measures which included altering images and destroying film. The USSR curtailed access to pornography, which was specifically prohibited by Soviet law.

Censorship of pornographic images
Soviet law prohibited the creation and distribution of pornography under Article 228 of the criminal code of the Russian Soviet Federative Socialist Republic and analogous legislation adopted by other republics of the Soviet Union.

While nude shots appeared in a number of Soviet films before the glasnost reform of the 1980s, the 1988 film Little Vera was the first to include an explicit sex scene.

Pornographic images and videotapes were smuggled into the Soviet Union for illegal distribution. In addition to the anti-pornographic law, such smuggling was prohibited by legal provisions giving the Soviet state the exclusive right to conduct foreign economic trade.

Censorship of historical photographs

The War Commissar

Yezhov was born in Saint Petersburg on May 1, 1895, and from 1915 to 1917 Yezhov served in the Tsarist Russian Army. He joined the Bolsheviks on May 5, 1917, in Vitebsk, a few months before the October Revolution. During the Russian Civil War (1919–1921), he fought in the Red Army. After February 1922, he worked in the political system, rising in 1935 to the Central Committee of the Communist Party; in the next year he became a secretary of the Central Committee. From February 1935 to March 1939 he was also the Chairman of the Central Commission for Party Control.

In 1935 he wrote a paper in which he argued that political opposition must eventually lead to violence and terrorism; this became in part the ideological basis of the Purges. He became People's Commissar for Internal Affairs (head of the NKVD) and a member of the Presidium Central Executive Committee on September 26, 1936. Under Yezhov, the purges reached their height, with roughly half of the Soviet political and military establishment being imprisoned or shot, along with hundreds of thousands of others, suspected of disloyalty or "wrecking." Yezhov was blamed for these "excesses" and on April 10, 1939, he was arrested. On February 4, 1940, he was executed.

Lenin's speech

On May 5, 1920, Lenin gave a famous speech to a crowd of Soviet troops in Sverdlov Square, Moscow. In the foreground were Leon Trotsky and Lev Kamenev. The photo was later altered and both were removed by censors.

Leon Trotsky

Leon Trotsky was a Ukrainian-born ethnically-Jewish Bolshevik revolutionary and Marxist theorist. He was an influential politician in the early days of the Soviet Union, first as People's Commissar for Foreign Affairs and later as the founder and commander of the Red Army and People's Commissar of War. He was also among the first members of the Politburo.

He became an enemy of the State and was erased from Soviet history after leading the failed struggle of the Left Opposition against the policies and rise of Joseph Stalin in the 1920s and the increasing bureaucratization of the Soviet Union. Trotsky was expelled from the Communist Party and deported from the Soviet Union in the Great Purge. As the head of the Fourth International, he continued in exile to oppose the Stalinist bureaucracy in the Soviet Union, and was eventually assassinated in Mexico by Ramón Mercader, a Soviet agent who used an ice axe to fatally stab Trotsky.  Trotsky's ideas form the basis of Trotskyism, a variation of communist theory, which remains a major school of Marxist thought that is opposed to the theories of Stalinism.

October Revolution celebration

On November 7, 1919, this image was snapped of the Soviet leadership celebrating the second anniversary of the October Revolution.  After Trotsky and his allies fell from power, a number of figures were removed from the image, including Trotsky and two people over to Lenin's left, wearing glasses and giving a salute. Lev Kamenev, two men over on Lenin's right, was another of Stalin's opponents, and below the boy in front of Trotsky, another bearded figure, Artemic Khalatov, the one time head of the state publishing, was also edited out.

Lev Kamenev

Kamenev was born in Moscow, the son of a Jewish railway worker and a Russian Orthodox housewife.  He joined the Russian Social Democratic Labor Party (RSDLP) in 1901 and its Bolshevik faction when the party split into Bolsheviks and Mensheviks in August 1903.  He climbed the ranks of the Soviet leadership and was briefly the nominal head of the Soviet state in 1917 and later chairman (1923–1924) of the ruling Politburo.

After Sergei Kirov's murder on December 1, 1934, which precipitated Stalin's Great Purges, Zinoviev, Kamenev and their closest associates were once again expelled from the Communist Party and arrested in December 1934. They were tried in January 1935 and were forced to admit "moral complicity" in Kirov's assassination. Zinoviev was sentenced to 10 years in prison, Kamenev to five years in prison. Kamenev was charged separately in early 1935 in connection with the Kremlin Case and, although he refused to confess, was sentenced to ten years in prison.

In August 1936, after months of careful preparations and rehearsals in Soviet secret police prisons, Zinoviev, Kamenev and 14 others, mostly Old Bolsheviks, were put on trial again in the Moscow Trials. Kamenev and all the others were found guilty and were executed by shooting on August 25, 1936.

Postcard

On November 7, 1917, Bolshevik leader Vladimir Lenin led his leftist revolutionaries in a revolt against the ineffective Provisional Government (Russia was still using the Julian Calendar at the time, so it is still called the October Revolution). The October Revolution ended the phase of the revolution instigated in February of that year, replacing Russia's short-lived provisional parliamentary government with government by soviets, local councils elected by bodies of workers and peasants. Liberal and monarchist forces, loosely organized into the White Army, immediately went to war against the Bolsheviks' Red Army.

During the Revolution a number of pictures were taken of successful fighters celebrating their victories. These were often used as postcards after the war. The background of the original image includes a store that says in Russian, "Watches, gold and silver". The image was then changed to read, "Struggle for your rights", and a flag was changed to more clearly read, "Down with the monarchy – long live the Republic!".

Union of Struggle for the Liberation of the Working Class

The  Union for Struggle of the Liberation of the Working Class, a St Petersburg-based organization, was founded by a number of Russian revolutionaries including Mikhail Kalinin and Lenin.   They would eventually merge with other groups to lay the foundation for the  Russian Social Democratic Labour Party (RSDRP).
The RSDRP formed in 1898 in Minsk to unite the various revolutionary organizations into one party. It would later split into Bolshevik and Menshevik factions, with the Bolsheviks eventually becoming the Communist Party of the Soviet Union.

This picture, taken in February 1897, records a meeting of the St. Petersburg chapter of the Union of Struggle for the Liberation of the Working Class. Shortly after the picture was taken the Okhrana arrested the whole group. The members received various punishments, with Lenin being arrested, held by authorities for fourteen months and then released and exiled to the village of Shushenskoye in Siberia, where he mingled with such notable Marxists as Georgy Plekhanov, who had introduced socialism to Russia.

Standing at center is Alexander Malchenko. At the time of this picture he was an engineering student and his mother would let Lenin hide out at her house. After his arrest he spent some time in exile before returning in 1900 and abandoning the revolution. He moved to Moscow, where he worked as a senior engineer in various state departments before in 1929 being arrested, wrongfully accused of being a "wrecker" and executed on November 18, 1930. After his arrest and execution he was airbrushed out of all reproductions. In 1958 he was posthumously rehabilitated and reappeared in reproductions of the image.

"Lost" cosmonaut
After cosmonaut Valentin Bondarenko died in a training accident in 1961, the Soviet government airbrushed him out of photographs of the first group of cosmonauts. As Bondarenko had already appeared in publicly available photographs, the deletions led to rumours of cosmonauts dying in failed launches. Both Bondarenko's existence and the nature of his death were secret until 1986.

Flag on the Reichstag

As Berlin fell in the closing days of the World War in Europe, Red Army photographer Yevgeny Khaldei gathered some soldiers and posed a shot of them hoisting the flag (called the Victory Banner) on the roof of the Reichstag building.  The photo represented a historic moment, the defeat of Germany in a war that cost the Soviet Union tens of millions of lives.

After taking the symbolic photo, Khaldei quickly returned to Moscow. He further edited the image at the request of the editor-in-chief of the Ogonyok, who noticed that Sen. Sgt. Abdulkhakim Ismailov, who is supporting the flag-bearer in the photo, had a wristwatch on each arm, indicating he had been looting. Later Soviet sources claimed that the extra watch was actually an Adrianov compass and that Khaldei, in order to avoid controversy, doctored the photo to remove the watch from Ismailov's right wrist. Khaldei also copied smoke in the background of another photo to make the scene more dramatic.

The photo was published May 13, 1945 in the Ogonyok magazine.  While many photographers took pictures of flags on the roof, it was Khaldei's image that stuck.

See also

Censorship in the Soviet Union
Damnatio memoriae
Eastern Bloc information dissemination
Newseum
Printed media in the Soviet Union
Propaganda in the Soviet Union

Annotations

Bibliography
Notes

References

Further reading
King, David, The Commissar Vanishes: The Falsification of Photographs and Art in Stalin's Russia (Metropolitan Books, 1997)

External links

Censorship in the Soviet Union
Photography in the Soviet Union
 
Soviet cover-ups